The eyespot gourami (Parasphaerichthys ocellatus) is a species of gourami endemic to Myanmar where it occurs in small, muddy streams and well vegetated shores of lakes. The species reaches 5 cm (2 inches) in standard length.

References

eyespot gourami
Endemic fauna of Myanmar
Fish of Myanmar
eyespot gourami